The Texas Medal of Honor Memorial is a statue commemorating recipients of the Medal of Honor from the state of Texas. Sculpted by Doyle Glass and Scott Boyer, it was dedicated on Memorial Day of 2008 in Midland, Texas at the Commemorative Air Force International Headquarters. In July 2018 the Memorial was assigned to the Ground Forces Detachment of the Commemorative Air Force and moved to Gainesville, Texas. Since May of 2021 it is currently on display at the International Artillery Museum in Saint Jo, Texas and open to the public.

The Memorial depicts Medal of Honor recipient George H. O'Brien, Jr. as he would appear on the day he earned the Medal of Honor for his service during the Korean War. Perched on a rock, the heroic-sized bronze figure rises above a granite base, which displays the names of most recipients of the medal from Texas.  The Model for this statue was Buck Hartlage a Louisville Kentucky native.

Other Recipients of the Medal of Honor from Texas

Indian Wars
 John Connor – Army, Galway, Ireland Jefferson, TX
 James B. Dozier – Army, Warren County, TN Fort Richardson, TX
 Pompey Factor – Army, Arkansas Fort Duncan, TX
 Robert Lee Howze – Army, Overton, TX Overton, TX
 George Loyd (or Lloyd) – Army, County Tyrone, Ireland Canton, TX
 William McCabe – Army, Belfast, Ireland Fort Duncan, TX
 Franklin M. McDonald – Army, Bowling Green, KY Fort Griffin, TX
 Adam Paine – aka: Adan Payne – Army, Florida Fort Duncan, TX
 Isaac Payne – Army, Mexico Fort Duncan, TX
 John Ward (or John Warrior) – Army, Arkansas Fort Duncan, TX

Spanish–American War
 George Frederick Phillips – Navy, Saint John, NB, Canada Galveston, TX

Philippine–American War
 George Mathews Shelton – Army, Brownwood, TX Bellington, TX

Mexican Campaign
 William Kelly Harrison – Navy, Waco, TX Texas

World War I
 David B. Barkeley, aka: David Bennes Barkley – Army, Laredo, TX San Antonio, TX
 Daniel Richmond Edwards – Army, Mooreville, TX Bruceville, TX
 David Ephraim Hayden – Navy, Florence, TX Texas

World War II
 Lucian Adams – Army, Port Arthur, TX Port Arthur, TX
 William James Bordelon – USMC, San Antonio, TX Texas
 John Duncan Bulkeley – Navy, San Antonio, TX Texas
 Horace Seaver Carswell, Jr. – Army AC, Fort Worth, TX San Angelo, TX
 Robert George Cole – Army, Fort Sam Houston, TX San Antonio, TX
 Samuel David Dealey – Navy, Dallas, TX Texas
 Forrest Eugene Everhart, Sr. – Army, Bainbridge, OH Texas City, TX
 James H. Fields – Army, Caddo, TX Houston, TX
 Thomas Weldon Fowler – Army, Wichita Falls, TX Wichita Falls, TX
 Marcario Garcia – Army, Villa De Castano, Mexico Sugar Land, TX
 William George Harrell – USMC, Rio Grande City, TX Mercedes, TX
 James Lindell Harris – Army, Hillsboro, TX Hillsboro, TX
 William Deane Hawkins – USMC, Fort Scott, KS El Paso, TX
 Lloyd Herbert Hughes – Army AC, Alexandria, LA San Antonio, TX
 Johnnie David Hutchins – Navy, Weimer, TX Texas
 Neel Ernest Kearby – Army AC, Wichita Falls, TX Dallas, TX
 George D. Keathley – Army, Olney, TX Lamesa, TX
 Truman Kimbro – Army, Madisonville, TX Houston, TX
 Jack Llewellyn Knight – Army, Garner, TX Weatherford, TX
 Raymond Larry Knight – Army AC, Houston, TX Houston, TX
 Turney White Leonard – Army, Dallas, TX Dallas, TX
 James Marion Logan – Army NcNeil, TX Luling, TX
 Jose Mendoze Lopez – Army, Mission, TX Brownsville, TX
 Jack Lummus – USMC, Ennis, TX Texas
 Jack Warren Mathis – Army AC, San Angelo, TX San Angelo, TX
 Audie Leon Murphy – Army, Kingston, TX Dallas, TX
 Charles Howard Roan – USMC, Claude, TX Texas
 James E. Robinson, Jr. – Army, Toledo, OH Waco, TX
 Cleto L. Rodriguez – Army, San Marcos, TX San Antonio, TX
 Herman C. Wallace – Army, Marlow, OK Lubbock, TX
 Eli Lamar Whiteley – Army, Florence, TX Georgetown, TX

Korean War
 George Andrew Davis, Jr. – USAF, Dublin, TX Lubbock, TX
 Ambrosio Guillen – USMC, La Junta, CO El Paso, TX
 Jack G. Hanson – Army, Escatawpa, MS Galveston, TX
 John Edward Kilmer – Navy, Highland Park, IL Houston, TX
 Benito Martinez – Army, Fort Hancock, TX Fort Hancock, TX
 Frank Nicias Mitchell – USMC, Indian Gap, TX Roaring Springs, TX
 Whitt Lloyd Moreland – USMC, Waco, TX Austin, TX
 George Herman O'Brien, Jr. – USMC, Fort Worth, TX Big Spring, TX
 Charles F. Pendleton – Army, Camden, TN Fort Worth, TX
 James Lamar Stone – Army, Pine Bluff, AR Houston, TX
 Travis E. Watkins – Army, Waldo, AR Texas

Vietnam War
 Richard Allen Anderson – USMC, Washington, DC Houston, TX
 Roy Perez Benavidez – Army, Cuero, TX Houston, TX
 Thomas Elbert Creek – USMC, Joplin, MO Amarillo, TX
 Alfredo "Freddy" Gonzalez – USMC, Edinburg, TX San Antonio, TX
 Robert David Law – Army, Fort Worth, TX Dallas, TX
 Milton Arthur Lee – Army, Shreveport, LA San Antonio, TX
 Finnis Dawson McCleery – Army, Stephenville, TX San Angelo, TX
 David Herbert McNerney – Army, Lowell, MA Fort Bliss, TX
 Clarence Eugene Sasser – Army, Chenango, TX Houston, TX
 Russell Albert Steindam – Army, Austin, TX Austin, TX
 Alfred Mac Wilson – USMC, Olney, IL Abilene, TX
 Marvin Rex Young – Army, Alpine, TX Odessa, TX

Texas-born honorees based elsewhere
The following Medal of Honor Recipients were born in the State of Texas, but either moved to or enlisted in military service in another state to which their award is accredited.
 William Grafton Austin – Army, Galveston, TX New York, NY – Indian Wars
 John McLennon – Army, Fort Belknap, TX Fort Ellis, MT – Indian Wars
 Samuel M. Sampler – Army, Decatur, TX Altus, OK – World War I
 Silvestre Santana Herrera – Army, El Paso, TX Phoenix, AZ – World War II
 John Riley Kane – Army AC, McGregor, TX Shreveport, LA – World War II
 John Cary "Red" Morgan – Army AC, Vernon, TX London, England – World War II
 George Benton Turner – Army, Longview, TX Los Angeles, CA – World War II
 Oscar Palmer Austin – USMC, Nacogdoches, TX Phoenix, AZ – Vietnam War
 Steven Logan Bennett – USAF, Palestine, TX Lafayette, LA – Vietnam War
 Frederick Edgar Ferguson – Army, Pilot Point, TX Phoenix, AZ – Vietnam War
 Terrence Collinson Graves – USMC, Corpus Christi, TX New York, NY – Vietnam War
 Miguel Keith – USMC, San Antonio, TX Omaha, NE – Vietnam War

Exception
One notable exception to the list may be the earliest Texan recipient, Milton M. Holland. He was born a Texas slave in 1844 and served with the Fifth U.S. Colored Troops during the Civil War.  On September 29, 1864, during an attack in which all his unit's officers were killed or disabled, Sergeant Major Holland took over despite his own wounds, and led his comrades to take the Confederate position near Richmond, Virginia.  He was awarded the Medal of Honor on April 6, 1865, and at his death in 1910 was interred at Arlington National Cemetery.

See also
Medal of Honor Memorial (Indianapolis)
Kentucky Medal of Honor Memorial
Oregon Veterans Medal of Honor Memorial

References

External links
Texas Medal of Honor Memorial
Commemorative Air Force
Doyle Glass Sculpture website
Lions of Medin website
War Hero Memorials
Kentucky Medal of Honor Memorial
Kentucky Medal of Honor Memorial (Kentucky Educational Television)

Medal of Honor
Military monuments and memorials in the United States
Monuments and memorials in Texas
Midland, Texas
2008 sculptures
Bronze sculptures in Texas
Statues in Texas
Sculptures of men in Texas
2008 establishments in Texas